Rossanese is an Italian association football club, based in Rossano, Calabria.

The club was founded in 1909.

Rossanese in the season 2010–11, from Serie D group I relegated, in the play-out, to Eccellenza Calabria, where it plays in the current season.

The team's colors are red and blue.

References

External links
Official homepage

Football clubs in Calabria
Association football clubs established in 1909
1909 establishments in Italy
Rossano